9454 Wilshire Boulevard, also known as The Bank of America Tower, is a 174,490 RSF (rentable square feet), 12-story landmark office building with a three-level underground parking lot located in Beverly Hills, California at the corner of Beverly Drive and Wilshire Boulevard.  Beverly Wilshire Investment Company, LLC, a real estate holding company owned and controlled by the Nourafchan Family, owns the building.

Location 
The building is located at 9454 on Wilshire Boulevard in the City of Beverly Hills.

History 
The building was built for the Glendale Federal Savings and Loan Association. It was completed in 1968. It was designed by  architects Robert E. Langdon, Jr. and Ernest C. Wilson, Jr. The cornice is made of dalle de verre, thus giving the impression of rainbow-like reflections as one gets closer to the building.

It was the first high-rise building in the Beverly Hills section of Wilshire Boulevard. It is a twelve-story high-rise, making it the tallest office building and the second tallest building in Beverly Hills after the Beverly Wilshire Hotel. The Beverly Hills City Council required the developer to create a green space in exchange for the height of the building. As a result, Reeves Park, a pocket park, was created.

There is a three-level subterranean parking lot underneath the building.

In 1981, the building was purchased by the Beverly Wilshire Investment Company, LLC. There is currently a Bank of America branch on the first floor.

Notable tenants include Bank of America, JP Morgan Chase, Ferrari, Compass, and First American Title Company.

References

External links 
 

Buildings and structures in Beverly Hills, California
Wilshire Boulevard
Skyscraper office buildings in California
Office buildings completed in 1968